Dan Russell is an artist, singer songwriter, artist advocate, producer and concert and event promoter. A graduate of Walpole High School in Massachusetts and later Barrington College, Russell is known for managing both the American rock band the Call and songwriter Michael Been and has worked in various capacities with such artists as Black Rebel Motorcycle Club, Sam Philips, Mark Heard, U2 and Brad Corrigan, Cheryl Kelley, Robin Lane, Ramona Silver, Vigilantes of Love, Rachael Taylor, among others.

Russell is the president of New Sound Artist Management and NewSound International and the co-founder (along with the late Mark Heard and Chuck Long) of record label Fingerprint Records. In 1994 he received a Grammy nomination for producing Fingerprint's compilation album Strong Hand of Love: A Tribute to Mark Heard, to which he also contributed the song, "I Just Wanna Get Warm." After years of contributing to the careers of other artists, Russell recorded his debut album, Feel the Echoes, which was successfully funded via Kickstarter, and currently working on a new release for 2022.

In 1998, Russell co-founded the first Soulfest, a faith-based social justice multi-day music festival originally held at Loon Mountain in Lincoln, New Hampshire.  Now in its 24th year, Russell continues to produce the festival currently held every summer at the Gunstock Mountain Resort in Gilford, New Hampshire, drawing more than 25,000 attendees annually to see over 100 bands, renowned authors and speakers on four stages.

Russell produces concert films and has expanded into music supervision for film and television, and he co-owns a music recording studio with his son Jesse Russell.

Awards and nominations 
 1994 – Best Rock Gospel Album (nominated) – Strong Hand of Love

Credits

Partial Discography 
This is a partial list of recordings on which Dan Russell has played a role.

 Fun in the First World – Andy Pratt (Enzone Records, 1982) – Executive Producer, Manager
 Not Just for Dancing – Andy Pratt (Lamborghini Records, 1983) – Executive Producer, Manager
 Heart Connection – Robin Lane & the Chartbusters (Indie, 1984) – Executive Producer, Manager
 Between the Answers – John Fischer (Myrrh Records, 1985) – Producer, Arranger (with Victor LeComer)
 Casual Crimes – John Fischer (Myrrh Records, 1986) – Producer, Arranger (with Victor LeComer)
 Tribal Opera – iDEoLA (What? Records, A&M/Myrrh, 1987) – National Marketing Director
 The Indescribable Wow – Sam Phillips (Virgin Records, 1988) – Tour Manager
 Let the Day Begin – the Call (MCA Records, 1989) – Tour Manager, co-Manager
 Red Moon – the Call (MCA Records, 1990) – Associate Producer, Manager
 Jugular – Vigilantes of Love (Fingerprint Records, 1990) – Executive Producer
 Dry Bones Dance – Mark Heard (Fingerprint Records, 1990) – Associate Producer
 Second Hand – Mark Heard (Fingerprint Records, 1991) – Production Associate
 Cruel Inventions – Sam Phillips (Virgin Records, 1991) – Tour Manager
 The Embarrassing Young – John Austin (Glasshouse Records, 1991) – Executive Producer
 Killing Floor – Vigilantes of Love (Fingerprint Records, 1992) – Executive Producer
 Satellite Sky – Mark Heard (Fingerprint Records, 1992) – Co-Producer with Jim Scott
 High Noon – Mark Heard (Myrrh Records, 1993) – Producer
 Love Is Everywhere Maxi Single – The Call (Fingerprint Records, 1994) – Co-Producer
 Welcome to Struggleville – Vigilantes of Love (Capricorn Records, 1994) – CoProducer with Jim Scott
 Strong Hand of Love: A Tribute to Mark Heard (Fingerprint, Epic and Myrrh Records, 1994) – Producer
 The Magic Brain of Unreason – Hezze (Fingerprint Records, 1995) – Executive Producer
 You & Me & Hell – Ramona Silver (Fingerprint Records, 1995) – Executive Producer, Manager
 Blister Soul – Vigilantes of Love (Capricorn Records, 1995) – Co-Producer
 V.O.L. – Vigilantes of Love (WEA, 1996) – Producer
 Orphans of God – Mark Heard Tribute Album (Fingerprint Records, 1996) – Producer
 Trailers – Ramona Silver (Fingerprint Records, 1996) – Executive Producer, Manager
 Slow Dark Train – Vigilantes of Love (Capricorn Records, 1997) – Co-Producer
 The Best of The Call – the Call (Warner Brothers, 1997) – Producer
 To Heaven and Back – the Call (Fingerprint Records, 1997) – Executive Producer
 Ultrasound – Ramona Silver (Fingerprint Records, 1998) – Executive Producer, Manager
 Mystery Mind – Mark Heard (Fingerprint Records, 2000) Producer
 Live Under the Red Moon – the Call (Conspiracy Records, 2000) – Executive Producer
 Death By Candy – Ramona Silver (Fingerprint Records, 2001) – Executive Producer, Manager
 Fan Dance – Sam Phillips (Nonesuch Records, 2001) – Manager
 B.R.M.C. – Black Rebel Motorcycle Club (Virgin Records, 2001) – Co-Manager with Graeme Lowe
 Hammers and Nails – Mark Heard (Paste Music, 2003) – Co-Producer with Buddy Miller
 Take Them On, On Your Own – Black Rebel Motorcycle Club (Virgin Records, 2003) – Co-Manager with Graeme Lowe
 A Boot and a Shoe – Sam Phillips (Nonesuch Records, 2004) – Manager
 Howl – Black Rebel Motorcycle Club (RCA and ECHO, 2005), Manager
 The Howl sessions EP – Black Rebel Motorcycle Club (RCA and ECHO, 2006) – Manager
 BABY 81 – Black Rebel Motorcycle Club (RCA and Island Records, 2007) – Manager
 American X: Baby 81 Sessions EP – Black Rebel Motorcycle Club (RCA, 2007) – Manager
 The Effects of 333 – Black Rebel Motorcycle Club (Abstract Dragon, 2008) – Manager
 Don't Do Anything – Sam Phillips (Nonsuch Records, 2008) – Manager
 Beat the Devil's Tattoo – Black Rebel Motorcycle Club (Vagrant Records and Cooperative Music Group, 2010) – Manager
 Big Kettle Drum – Big Kettle Drum (BKD Records, 2012) – Executive Producer, Manager
 Heartbreak Is For Everyone – Rachel Taylor (Taylor Records, 2012) Co-Producer, Co-writer ("Broken"), Manager
 Specter at the Feast – Black Rebel Motorcycle Club (Vagrant Records and Co-Op/Pias, 2013) – Manager
 A Tribute to Michael Been – the Call featuring Robert Levon Bean (Label Records, 2014) – Producer with Robert Been and the Call.
 Feel the Echoes – Dan Russell (Fingerprint Records, 2017) - Artist 
Remastered re-release of Mark Heard's 1990 fingerprint release of Dry Bones Dance (2022)

Filmography 
 Strong Hand of Love (1994) – producer
 Black Rebel Motorcycle Club Live (2009)- producer
 Black Rebel Motorcycle Club: Live in London (2010) – producer
 The Call Live at the Troubadour: A Tribute to Michael Been (2014) – producer

References

External links 
 Dan Russell Music
 YouTube

Living people
Music promoters
Year of birth missing (living people)
Place of birth missing (living people)